Kitagawia is a genus of flowering plants belonging to the family Apiaceae.

Its native range is temperate Asia. It is found in the countries of China (within Manchuria and Inner Mongolia), Japan, Kazakhstan, Korea, Mongolia, Taiwan and the Russian regions and republics of Altay, Amur, Buryatiya, Chita, Irkutsk, Khabarovsk, Krasnoyarsk, Kuril Islands, Primorye, Sakhalin, Tuva, Western Siberia and Yakutskiya).
	
The genus name of Kitagawia is in honour of Masao Kitagawa (1910–1995), a Japanese botanist and pteridologist.
It was first described and published in Bot. Zhurn. (Moscow & Leningrad) Vol.71 on page 943 in 1986.

Known species
According to Kew:
Kitagawia baicalensis 
Kitagawia eryngiifolia 
Kitagawia formosana 
Kitagawia litoralis 
Kitagawia macilenta 
Kitagawia pilifera 
Kitagawia praeruptora 
Kitagawia stepposa 
Kitagawia terebinthacea

References

Apioideae
Plants described in 1986
Flora of Siberia
Flora of the Russian Far East
Flora of Manchuria
Flora of Inner Mongolia
Flora of Mongolia
Flora of Eastern Asia